Jean-Louis Ferrary (May 5, 1948 – August 9, 2020) was a French historian, a specialist in ancient Rome.

Biography 
Born in 1948 in Orléans, Jean-Louis Ferrary entered the École Normale Supérieure in 1967 and obtained his agrégation in Classical Letters in 1970. A member of the École française de Rome from 1973 to 1976, he was then elected a lecturer at the Sorbonne University and continued his career at the École pratique des hautes études, where he has been a lecturer (1983) and director of studies (since 1989). His lecture title was « Histoire des institutions et des idées politiques du monde romain ». 
He received his PhD in 1987 after working under the direction of Pierre Grimal and Claude Nicolet. His thesis, Philhellénisme et impérialisme : aspects idéologiques de la conquête romaine du monde hellénistique, is a milestone in the study of the relations between Rome and the Greek world.

Jean-Louis Ferrary was interested in the history of institutions, law and the laws of ancient Rome, in the history of ideas and the ancient political philosophy, in Greek and Latin epigraphy of Roman times, Latin philology and historiography.

He was elected to the Académie des Inscriptions et Belles-Lettres in 2005, succeeding Maurice Euzennat. He was a specialist of Polybius and Cicero.
He was elected to the American Philosophical Society in 2019. He died in Paris.

Honours
 Knight of the Legion of Honour (France) 
 Knight of the National Order of Merit (France) 
 Commander of the Ordre des Palmes Académiques (France)

Main publications 

 Philhellénisme et impérialisme. Aspects idéologiques de la conquête romaine du monde hellénistique, Rome, BEFAR, 1988
 Onofrio Panvinio et les Antiquités romaines, Rome, Collection de l’École Française de Rome, 1996
 Recherches sur les lois comitiales et sur le droit public romain, Pavie, Pavia University Press, 2012
 Les mémoriaux de délégations de Claros, d’après la documentation conservée dans le Fonds Jeanne et Louis Robert, Paris, De Boccard, 2015
 Rome et le monde grec : Choix d'écrits, Paris, Les Belles Lettres, 2016
 Dall'ordine repubblicano ai poteri di Augusto : aspetti della legislazione romana, Rome, L'Erma di Bretschneider, 2016
 Quintus Mucius Scævola : Opra, Rome, L'Erma di Bretschneider, coll. « Scriptores iuris Romani », 2018

References

External links 
 Biography on the site of the Académie des Inscriptions et Belles Lettres
 Sa fiche sur le site de l'équipe de recherche Anhima - Histoire et anthropologie des mondes anciens

Academic staff of the École pratique des hautes études
French scholars of Roman history
French epigraphers
20th-century French historians
École Normale Supérieure alumni
Members of the Académie des Inscriptions et Belles-Lettres
Chevaliers of the Légion d'honneur
Knights of the Ordre national du Mérite 
Commandeurs of the Ordre des Palmes Académiques 
Writers from Orléans
1948 births
2020 deaths
Members of the American Philosophical Society